This World They'll Drown is a mini-album by Exit Ten, released in 2006.
A video was made for Resume Ignore.

Track listing
 "Softwatch" - 4:46
 "Fine Night" - 4:18
 "Resume Ignore" - 4:46
 "A Path To Take" - 4:36
 "My Great Rebellion" - 5:04

Credits
Ryan Redman - Vocals
Stuart Steele - Guitar
Joe Ward - Guitar 
James Steele - Bass
Chris Steele - Drums
Andy Sneap - Production

Exit Ten albums
2006 EPs
Albums produced by Andy Sneap